Tyrone Brunson may refer to:

Tyrone Brunson (boxer) (born 1985), American boxer
Tyrone Brunson (musician) (1956–2013), American singer and musician